We Remember Cannon is a live album by Nat Adderley's Quintet recorded in Switzerland in 1989 and released on the In + Out label.

Reception

The Penguin Guide to Jazz states "We Remember Cannon is pretty much state of the art for the late 80s band". In his review for AllMusic, Scott Yanow stated "Cornetist Nat Adderley is in better shape than usual on this spirited live date with his quintet ... there are plenty of witty and informative verbal introductions by Adderley to the audience about the songs, and the rhythm section is quite complementary. A worthy effort".

Track listing
 "I'll Remember April" (Gene de Paul, Patricia Johnston, Don Raye) – 10:12
 "Unit 7" (Sam Jones) – 8:02
 "Talkin' About You, Cannon" (Nat Adderley) – 6:51
 "Work Song" (Adderley) – 6:35
 "Soul Eyes" (Mal Waldron) – 10:35
 "Stella by Starlight" (Victor Young, Ned Washington) – 9:54
 "Autumn Leaves" (Joseph Kosma, Johnny Mercer, Jacques Prévert) – 13:51

Personnel
Nat Adderley – cornet
Vincent Herring – alto saxophone
Arthur Resnick – piano
Walter Booker – bass
Jimmy Cobb – drums

References

1991 live albums
Nat Adderley live albums